Amine Benchaib (born 18 June 1998) is a Belgian footballer who plays for CS Mioveni in the Romanian Liga I as a midfielder.

Club career
Amine Benchaib started his career with Lokeren. He made his debut with Lokeren in a 3-0 Belgian First Division A win over K.A.S. Eupen on 14 April 2018.

On 31 January 2022, Benchaib signed a 3.5-year contract with Kortrijk.

Personal life
Born in Belgium, Benchaib is of Moroccan descent.

External links
 
 FDB Profile

References

1998 births
Living people
Association football midfielders
Belgian footballers
Belgian sportspeople of Moroccan descent
R. Charleroi S.C. players
K.S.C. Lokeren Oost-Vlaanderen players
K.V. Kortrijk players
CS Mioveni players
Belgian Pro League players
Challenger Pro League players
Liga I players
Belgian expatriate footballers
Expatriate footballers in Romania
Belgian expatriate sportspeople in Romania